This is a list of notable Albanian Americans, including both original immigrants who obtained American citizenship and their American descendants.

Politics
 Sal Albanese – politician
 Richard Caliguiri – American politician
 Joe DioGuardi – American congressman
 Mark Gjonaj – American assemblyman, New York
 Rexhep Krasniqi – Albanian-American historian, teacher, nationalist, and anti-communist politician and activist
 Konstantina Lukes – American former mayor of Worcester, Massachusetts
 Victor Schiro – Mayor of New Orleans during the early 1960s of Arbereshe ancestry
 Nicholas Scutari – American Democratic Party politician
 Adrian Zika – American Republican Politician from Florida

Science and academia
 Carol Folt – American biologist and first woman leader of the University of North Carolina at Chapel Hill and 12th president of the University of Southern California
 William G. Gregory – American astronaut
 Laura Mersini-Houghton – Albanian-American cosmologist
 Ferid Murad – American medical researcher Nobel laureate
 Arshi Pipa –  philosopher, writer, poet and literary critic
 Andrea Shundi – agronomist
 Stavro Skëndi – linguist and historian
 Etel Adnan – Lebanese-American poet, essayist, and visual artist

Cinema
 Jim Belushi – American actor
 John Belushi – American actor and film producer
 Robert Belushi – American actor
 James Biberi – Albanian-American actor
 Mike Bongiorno  – Italian-American television host
 Danny DeVito – American actor
 Eliza Dushku – American actress
 Nate Dushku – American actor
 Mike Dusi – American actor and film producer
 Enver Gjokaj – American actor
 Victor Gojcaj – American actor
 Agim Kaba – American actor and film producer
 Masiela Lusha – Albanian-American actress
 Pjetër Malota – actor
 Andamion Murataj – Albanian film director, producer, and screenwriter
 Mitchel Musso – American actor, voice actor, singer-songwriter and musician
 Tracee Chimo Pallero – American actress
 J. J. Philbin – American producer and screenwriter
 Nickola Shreli – actor and producer
 Nik Xhelilaj – actor

Arts and entertainment
 Michael Bellusci – American musician and drummer
 Olivier Berggruen – art historian and curator; his maternal grandfather is Alessandro Moissi who is of Albanian origin
 Cindy Marina – beauty pageant titleholder, model, TV host and volleyball player who was born in Chicago to Albanian parents. Marina was crowned Miss Universe Albania 2019 and placed Top 20 at Miss Universe 2019
 Big Body Bes – American hip-hop artist
 Anita Bitri – singer
 Njomza – Albanian-American singer
 Bleona – Albanian-American singer
 Action Bronson – American hip-hop artist
 Luke Burbank – radio and podcast host
 Drita D'Avanzo – American television personality
 Kara DioGuardi – American singer-songwriter and television personality
 Tony Dovolani – Albanian-American professional ballroom dancer
 Stan Dragoti – American film director, producer, artist
 Kristine Elezaj – Albanian-American singer
 Bosch Fawstin – American cartoonist
 Gashi – Albanian-American hip-hop artist
 Jen Selter – American fitness model
 Genta Ismajli – American-Albanian singer-songwriter, and actress
 JMSN – American singer-songwriter and producer
 Joe Lala – American actor and singer
 Paul Leka – American music songwriter and producer
 Lindita – singer-songwriter
 Ava Max – American singer
 Gjon Mili – pioneer master photographer
 Burim Myftiu – Albanian-American contemporary photographer, curator and visual artist
 Thomas Nassi – musician and composer
 Vasiliev Nini – Albanian-born American sculptor
 Tracee Chimo Pallero - Albanian American television, film and Broadway actress
 George Pali – painter
 Steven Parrino – American artist and musician associated with energetic punk nihilism
 Talip Peshkepia – American film composer and songwriter
 Regis Philbin – American television personality
 Bebe Rexha – American singer-songwriter
 Sxip Shirey – American electric-acoustic composer, performer, and storyteller
 Bobbi Starr – pornographic actress
 Aureta Thomollari – Albanian-American luxury consultant
 Sislej Xhafa – contemporary artist
 Unikkatil – Albanian-American rapper
 Melinda Ademi – Albanian-American rapper, singer and songwriter
 Enisa Nikaj – American pop singer, model and songwriter
 Anxhelina Hadërgjonaj – Albanian-American singer, fashion blogger and influencer

Literature
 Pema Browne – American abstract artist
 Costa Chekrezi –  Albanian patriot, historian, and publicist
 Daniela Gioseffi – poet, novelist, literary critic, essayist, and performer
 Betim Muço –  writer, poet, translator, and seismologist
 Emin Toro –  American lawyer
 Ardian Vehbiu –  author and translator

Business and civil society
 Anthony Athanas – restaurateur
 Ekrem Bardha – businessman, political activist
 Nicolas Berggruen – businessman
 Mark Gjonaj – businessman, politician
 Florin Krasniqi – businessman, politician
 James J. Schiro – businessman
 Martin Shkreli – businessman
 Ramiz Tafilaj – businessman, political activist
 Olsi Rama – project manager
 Louis V. Mato – American politician and businessman
 Rexh Xhakli – businessman, political activist and philanthropist

Media
 Fadil Berisha – photographer
 Emin Kadi – photographer, journalist, art director
 Florina Kaja – singer and reality TV actress, The Bad Girls Club Season 4
 Bill Kovach – journalist and editor
 Donald Lambro – journalist
 Eric Margolis – journalist and editor of the Toronto Sun; mother is Albanian
 Gjekë Marinaj – author and translator
 Gjon Mili – photographer
 Burim Myftiu – photographer
 Tom Perrotta  – novelist and screenwriter
 Molly Qerim – moderator, reporter
 George Tames – photographer for The New York Times
 Nick Tosches – journalist, novelist, biographer, and poet
 Nexhmie Zaimi – journalist
 Iliriana Sulkuqi – journalist
 Andrew Kaczynski – journalist, and a political reporter for CNN

Models
 Emina Cunmulaj – model
 Floriana Garo – television presenter and model
 Jasmina Cunmulaj – American model
 Afërdita Dreshaj – model, singer, beauty queen
 Angela Martini – model
 Cindy Marina – model, volleyball player, and beauty pageant titleholder who was crowned Miss Universe Albania 2019

Sport
 Dilly Duka – MLS soccer player
 Lee Elia – baseball player, coach and manager
 Elizabeta Karabolli – shooting sport
 Elvir Muriqi – professional boxer
 Aaron Palushaj – professional hockey player
 Andy Parrino – baseball player
 Enkelejda Shehu – air pistol shooter
 Jaren Sina – basketball player
 Kristjan Sokoli – NFL player
 Donald Suxho – volleyball
 Andy Varipapa – professional trick bowler
 Joe Albanese – baseball player
 Robert Baggio Kcira – American soccer player
 Šaćir Hot – American soccer player
 Frank Leskaj – American swimmer
 Halil Kanacević – American-born Montenegrin professional basketball player
 Max Rugova – Kosovo Albanian professional footballer
 Sadri Gjonbalaj – retired American soccer player
 Tie Domi – professional ice hockey player
 Dominick Bellizzi – American jockey
 Kristina Maksuti – American-born Albanian professional footballer
 Vera Razburgaj – Albanian football midfielder
 Max Rugova – soccer player

Religion
 Archbishop Nikon of Boston – OCA's Bishop of Diocese of New England, Locum tenens of Diocese of the South, and Archbishop of American Albanian Archdiocese
 Baba Rexheb

Criminals
 John Alite – mobster
 Joseph Ardizzone – mobster
 Ismail Lika – mobster
 Martin Shkreli – convicted of securities fraud
 Sami Osmakac – convicted terrorist

References

External links 
 National Albanian American Council
 Alb-Net.Com – The Albanian Connection
 Albanian Americans – history, the first Albanians in America, significant immigration waves, settlement patterns and notable Albanian Americans

american people of Arbereshe descent

Americans
Lists of American people by ethnic or national origin
Lists of people by ethnicity